The following highways are numbered 10N.

United States
 U.S. Route 10N (Montana) (former)
 U.S. Route 10N (Minnesota) (former)
 New Jersey Route 10N (former)

See also
List of highways numbered 10